Chista Yasrebi (born 19 October 1968 in Tehran, Iran) is an Iranian university lecturer, playwright, translator, literary critic and publisher.

Early life and education 
Yasrebi was born in Tehran in 1968. She received her B.Sc. and M.Sc. in psychology at Alzahra University. She has worked in theatre since 1989. She has manages several plays on the scene.

Works 
 Postchi
 Sheyda va soofi
 Moaleme piano
 Eshgh dar zamane ma

Republication of her works 
The organizations and institutions in Iran republished Yasrebi's works. Some of her republished works are as follows:
 Chista Yasrebi's republished work by the National Content Consortium
 Chista Yasrebi's republished work by the Center for the Great Islamic Encyclopedia

Outlooks 
Women are present as well as men in Shahnameh, the masterpiece of Ferdowsi.
I knew Ferdowsi in his respect of women and family and never saw that he reduces the value of family in his precious masterpiece.

References

External links 

Living people
People from Tehran
Al-Zahra University alumni
1968 births
Iranian theatre directors
Iranian translators
Iranian critics
Iranian women critics
Iranian literary critics
Iranian dramatists and playwrights
Women dramatists and playwrights